Evans Nana Ekow Aryee (born 2 April 1998) also known as "Evans the Hulk" is a Belgium-based Ghanaian strongman and powerlifter and the reigning Belgium deadlift record holder with 338 kg

Career
Aryee is the reigning second strongest man in East Flanders, Belgium with over 10 international and local trophies to his credit. Evans Aryee  is one of the few men from Belgium  to participate  Champions League of the Strongest men.

Evans is one of the highly ranked powerlifters across the world.

Education 
Evans is an alumnus of the Adisadel College in Cape Coast, Ghana and holds a bachelor's degree in Finance and Economics

Professional Record 

 Deadlift - 338 kg ( Belgium record)
 Squat -  672.4
 Bench 418.8
 2022 Strongman Champions League - 6th Position
 2022 Imatra Strongman  Showdown  - 10th Position

References 

1998 births
Living people
Ghanaian weightlifters
Strength athletes